Halter is a surname. Notable people with the surname include:

Bill Halter, Lieutenant Governor of Arkansas
Ed Halter, film programmer, writer, and founder of Light Industry
Lars Halter, German-American journalist and currently General Chairman of the Steuben Parade
Marek Halter, French novelist
Paul Halter, French novelist
Shane Halter, American baseball player
Sydney Halter, Canadian lawyer and the first commissioner of the Canadian Football League